Alamdeh-e Gharbi (also Romanized as ‘Alamdeh-e Gharbī) is a village in Harazpey-ye Shomali Rural District, Sorkhrud District, Mahmudabad County, Mazandaran Province, Iran. At the 2006 census, its population was 393, in 103 families.

References 

Populated places in Mahmudabad County